The Damned, the Shamed is the third full-length album release by American beatdown hardcore band Terror.

Track listing 
"Voice of the Damned"
"Relentless Through and Through"
"Betrayer"
"Rise of the Poisoned Youth"
"Never Alone"
"What I Despise"
"Let Me Sink"
"Feel the Pain"
"Lost Our Minds"
"March to Redemption"
"Crush What's Weak"
"Still Believe"
"Suffer, to Return Harder"
"Iron Mind" (bonus track on European version)

References

2008 albums
Terror (band) albums
Century Media Records albums